Derek Wilkinson (born July 29, 1974) is a Canadian former professional ice hockey goaltender.

Career 
Wilkinson played his entire National Hockey League career with the Tampa Bay Lightning. His NHL career started in 1995 and he lasted until the 1999 season. He appeared in 22 games in his NHL career.

He was the final head coach of the Charlotte Checkers of the ECHL, from 2004 until the team moved up to the American Hockey League in 2010.

Career statistics

Regular season and playoffs

External links 

1974 births
Living people
Atlanta Knights players
Belfast Giants players
Belleville Bulls players
Charlotte Checkers (1993–2010) players
Chicago Wolves (IHL) players
Cleveland Lumberjacks players
Detroit Compuware Ambassadors players
Detroit Junior Red Wings players
ECHL coaches
Ice hockey people from Ontario
People from Essex County, Ontario
Tampa Bay Lightning draft picks
Tampa Bay Lightning players
Canadian expatriate ice hockey players in Northern Ireland
Canadian ice hockey goaltenders
Canadian ice hockey coaches
Canadian expatriate ice hockey players in the United States